The 2012–13 Real Zaragoza season is the 78th season in club history.

Review and events

Competitions

La Liga

League table

Legend

Matches

Copa del Rey

Round of 32

Round of 16

Quarter-finals

Squad

Sources

Real Zaragoza
Real Zaragoza seasons